The scimitar-billed woodcreeper (Drymornis bridgesii) is a species of bird in the Dendrocolaptinae subfamily. It is the only species placed in the genus Drymornis. It is found in Argentina, Bolivia, Brazil, Paraguay, and Uruguay, where its natural habitats are subtropical or tropical dry forests and subtropical or tropical dry shrubland.

The scimitar-billed woodcreeper is genetically most closely related to the greater scythebill (Drymotoxeres pucheranii). The species is monotypic: no subspecies are recognised.

References

scimitar-billed woodcreeper
Birds of Argentina
Birds of Paraguay
Birds of Uruguay
scimitar-billed woodcreeper
scimitar-billed woodcreeper
Taxonomy articles created by Polbot